Longueil is a commune in the Seine-Maritime department in the Normandy region in northern France.

Geography

Coat of arms

Population

Places of interest
 The church of Saint-Pierre, dating from the 13th and 16th century.
 Ruins of an 11th and 12th century castle.

See also
Communes of the Seine-Maritime department
Longueuil, Quebec

References

Communes of Seine-Maritime